Theophilus Goldridge Pinches M.R.A.S. (1856 – 6 June 1934 Muswell Hill, London), was a pioneer British assyriologist.

Pinches was originally employed in father's business as a die-sinker, but, following an amateur interest in cuneiform inscriptions, joined the staff of the British Museum in 1878, working there as assistant then curator till retirement in 1900. He was lecturer in Assyriology at University College London and in the University of Liverpool till 1932 or 1933, and died in 1934.

During his tenure at the Egyptian and Assyrian Department, British Museum, he gave assistance to scholars including Abraham Sachs and taught at London University. It was largely due to his "painstaking work" during his time as assistant keeper at the British Museum between 1895 and 1900, that many pieces acquired by the museum were joined again. He also translated some Babylonian tablets which related to the Battle of the Vale of Siddim and was one of the editors of The Babylonian and Oriental Record from 1886. In 1890, Pinches discovered and published the correct reading of the name of Gilgamesh, instead of Izdubar. The document known as Chronicle P - providing important historical information despite its bad condition - is named for Pinches, who was its first editor. 

Pinches died in 1934 and "bequeathed much of his large personal collection of cuneiform tablets" to a favorite student, Archibald Cecil Chappelow.

Works
 
 Texts in the Babylonian wedge-writing, 1880
 The Religion of Babylonia and Assyria, 1906
 The Old Testament in the Light of the Historical Records and Legends of Assyria and Babylonia, 1908

References

External links
 
 

1856 births
1934 deaths
British Assyriologists
Employees of the British Museum
Assyriologists